is a Japanese manga artist. He is best known for the manga Those Who Hunt Elves, which was adapted as an anime series. His works Those Who Hunt Elves, Dokkoida?!, Go West!, and Hikkatsu! Strike a Blow to Vivify have been licensed in English.

Yagami's works are predominantly comedy shōnen manga with science fiction or high fantasy settings—for example, Dokkoida?! is a superhero parody series and Go West! a western parody. Many feature protagonists that use martial arts, usually some form of karate, such as Junpei in Those Who Hunt Elves and Shota in Hikkatsu! Strike a Blow to Vivify). Yagami himself is a karate aficionado, and is a member of the Kendokai Karate-do. Most of his works are published by MediaWorks and serialized in their Dengeki Comic Gao! magazine.

Works

Manga

Illustrations 

Style 

Yagami's work in Those Who Hunt Elves is featured prominently in Volume 2 of the popular manga drawing instructional series How to Draw Manga, “Compiling Techniques”.
Several frames from the manga are held up as examples of good use of screentones.

References

1969 births
Living people
Manga artists from Hyōgo Prefecture
People from Amagasaki